Meet Me on Broadway is a 1946 American comedy film directed by Leigh Jason and written by George Bricker and Jack Henley. The film stars Marjorie Reynolds, Frederick Brady, Jinx Falkenburg, Spring Byington, Allen Jenkins, Gene Lockhart and Loren Tindall. The film was released on January 26, 1946, by Columbia Pictures.

Synopsis
A Broadway director clashes one too many times with his producer and quits the show and takes his girlfriend the leading lady with him. He believes he can set up more successfully on his own, but soon finds himself in deep financial trouble. He manages to get a booking at a country club but only gets his reluctant girlfriend to perform their by convincing her he has been made manager of it.

Cast          
Marjorie Reynolds as Ann Stallings
Frederick Brady as Eddie Dolan 
Jinx Falkenburg as Maxine Whittaker
Spring Byington as Sylvia Storm
Allen Jenkins as Deacon McGill
Gene Lockhart as John Whittaker 
Loren Tindall as Bob Storm
 William Forrest as Dwight Ferris
 Kernan Cripps as Gardner 
 Frank Dawson as 	Belden, the Butler
 Ralph Peters as 	Joe, the Bartender
 Eddie Acuff as Waiter

References

External links
 

1946 films
American comedy films
1946 comedy films
Columbia Pictures films
Films directed by Leigh Jason
American black-and-white films
1940s English-language films
1940s American films